Élisabeth Lebovici (born 1953) is a French art historian, journalist, and art critic.

Biography 
Élisabeth Lebovici completed her studies in Paris and New York, where she was enrolled in the Independent Study Program at the Whitney Museum of American Art. In 1983, she defended her thesis L'Argent dans le discours des artistes américains, 1980-81 [Money in the discourse of American artists, 1980-81] at the Université Paris X.

In 1991, she joined the staff of the French newspaper Libération, where she worked until 2006. She was previously editor-in-chef of the magazine Beaux Arts and contributed as well to the journal art press. Since 2006 she coorganizes the seminar "Something You Should Know: artistes et producteurs" at the School for Advanced Studies in the Social Sciences in Paris.

She is particularly interested in studying genders and sexualities, and is engaged in examining the relationships between feminism, queer theory, art history, and contemporary art.

Élisabeth Lebovici is the author of numerous monographic studies on contemporary artists and teaches at the School for Advanced Studies in the Social Sciences. She is also an advocate for LGBT rights.

Bibliography 
 Ruggieri: 150 ans de feux d'artifice, with Patrick Braco, éditions Denoël, 1989.
 Annette Messager: Faire Parade, éditions Paris Musées (MAMVP), 1995,.
 Claude Cahun photographe, with François Leperlier, éditions Paris Musées et Jean-Michel Place, 1995.
 Zoe Leonard, éditions du Centre national de la photographie, 1998,.
 L'Intime, editor, éditions de l'École nationale supérieure des Beaux-Arts, 1998,.
 Philippe Thomas, with Corinne Diserens, Daniel Soutif, Jean-Philippe Antoine, and Patricia Falguières, Musée d'art contemporain de Barcelone et Le Magasin, 2000–2001.
 If on a Winter's Night… Roni Horn, with Urs Stahel, éditions Steidl Verlag, 2005,.
 Valérie Mréjen, monograph, éditions Léo Scheer, coll. Pointligneplan, 2005,.
 Georges Tony Stoll, with Dominique Baqué, éditions du Regard, 2006,.
 Femmes artistes/Artistes femmes: Paris, de 1880 à nos jours, with Catherine Gonnard, éditions Hazan, 2007,.
 Louise Bourgeois, with Marie-Laure Bernadac and Frances Morris, Tate Publishing, 2007; and with Jonas Storsve, Centre Pompidou, 2008,.
 Zoe Leonard: photographs, with Urs Stahel, Svetlana Alpers, and Zoe Leonard, Steidl Verlag, 2008.
 Olga Kisseleva: Mondes croisés, éditions Archibook, 2008.
 À Roni Horn, with Éric Mézil, éditions de la collection Lambert & Éditions Phébus, 2009,.
 Martin Szekely, éditions JPR|Ringier, 2010,.
 Nancy Spero, œuvres sur papier 1926-2009, with Jonas Storsve, éditions Gallimard/Centre Pompidou, 2010,.
 Brigit Jürgenssen, with Gabriele Schor and Heike Eipeldauer, Bank Austria Forum Sammlung/Prestel Verlag, 2010.
 Mark Morrisroe: « in the Darkroom », with Beatrix Ruf, Thomas Seelig... JRP/Ringier, 2010, .
 Tacita Dean, the Friar's Doodle, with Lynne Cooke, Abadia de Santo Domingo de Silos/Madrid, Museo Nacional Centro de Arte Reina Sofía, Actar, 2010,.
 General Idea, Trouble dans le genre, with Frédéric Bonnet, Paris-Musées and JRP/RIngier, 2011,.
 Looking For Rosa Barba, in Rosa Barba. White is an Image, ed. Chiara Parisi and Andrea Villiani, Hatje Cantz, 2011, p. 230-235,.
 Katharina Grosse, in Katharina Grosse: Wunderbild, ed. Adam Budak, Verlag der Buchhandlung Walther Konig, 2018, p. 230-235,.
 Conversation with Lili Reynaud-Dewar, in Lili Reynaud-Dewar, ed. Michele Robecchi, Phaidon, 2019, p. 230-235,.

References

External links 
 Authority control: Fichier d'autorité international virtuel • International Standard Name Identifier • Bibliothèque nationale de France • Système universitaire de documentation • WorldCat
 https://rwm.macba.cat/en/sonia/sonia-279-elisabeth-lebovici, Conversation/podcast with Élisabeth Lebovici, 2019
 http://le-beau-vice.blogspot.fr/, Élisabeth Lebovici's official blog (in French)

French art critics
French art historians
1953 births
Living people
French art curators
French women curators
French women historians
French women art critics